Species is a science-fiction-action horror film series created by Dennis Feldman consisting of three related films and one standalone film.

Films
 Species (1995)
 Species II (1998)
 Species III (2004)
 Species: The Awakening (2007)

Cast
  indicates the actor portrayed the role of a younger version of the character.
  indicates a cameo appearance.

Crew

Reception

Box office performance

Critical and public response

References

Film series introduced in 1995
Science fiction horror film series
Amazon (company) franchises
Metro-Goldwyn-Mayer franchises
Action film series